Vernon L. Walker (May 2, 1894 – March 1, 1948) was an American special effects artist and cinematographer. He was nominated for four Academy Awards for Best Special Effects. He worked on more than 220 films during his career, starting out as a head cameraman for Otis B. Thayer's Art-O-Graf Film Company in 1919.

Selected filmography
Walker was nominated for four Academy Awards:
 A Front Page Story (1922)
 The Right of the Strongest (1924)
 The Hansom Cabman (1924)
 Flirty Four-Flushers (1926)
 The Girl from Everywhere (1927)
 The Man from Hard Pan (1927)
 The Long Loop on the Pecos (1927)
 Bringing Up Baby (1938)
 Swiss Family Robinson (1940)
 The Navy Comes Through (1942)
 Bombardier (1943)
 Days of Glory (1944)

References

External links

1894 births
1948 deaths
American cinematographers
Artists from Detroit
Special effects people